Jade Valerie Villalon (born August 12, 1980), also known by her project and stage name Jade Valerie, is an American pop singer, songwriter, and actress. From 1999 to 2007, she was the vocalist and lyricist of Sweetbox, releasing five original albums and a number of compilations. During this time, each major release achieved either a gold or platinum status in Japan and Korea, also earning various awards and chart positions around the world.

Following Villalon's departure from this project, both Villalon, and Sweetbox composer and producer Rosan Geoman, worked together once again to release albums under Villalon's own name, Jade Valerie. After two album releases under this name, two additional side-projects were formed, entitled Eternity ∞ and Saint Vox, both releasing a self-titled album respectively. Saint Vox presented a collaboration effort between Villalon's vocal and lyrical work, Geoman's arrangements of both original and sampled classical pieces, and the stylings of Japanese violinist, Emiri Miyamoto.

Biography
Jade Valerie Villalon was born on August 12, 1980, and was raised in San Diego, California. She currently resides in Geneva, Switzerland.

Acting
As a child, Villalon began her career by auditioning for, and acting in, television commercials and promotional material. Her first full-length acting role was at the age of seven for the Broadway musical Gypsy. Around this time, she was also featured in a media advertisement with Michelle Williams. At the age of seventeen, she guest-starred as Melanie, a teenager in a camp for HIV-positive teenagers, in the television program Touched by an Angel (Episode 70: "The Pact"). After gaining recognition for her vocal performance in the episode, she appeared in various music videos for other artists, such as the video TLC's "Unpretty". Villalon also had a small appearance as an extra in the movie Sorority Boys.

Music
In Villalon's career as a vocalist, she has released nine original albums, has been presented with a number of international awards and sales certifications, has had her music featured in a number of commercials and television spots, and also has lent her voice to perform the vocal songs Real Emotion and "1000 Words" on the English version of the video game Final Fantasy X-2. Her albums in Sweetbox have all reached gold or platinum status in Korea, and many of her singles have ranked in the Top 10 on charts in Europe and Asia. Villalon has also written songs for a number of artists, including The Cheetah Girls and Ayumi Hamasaki, as well as for Ateed, and has had her works covered by artists such as S.H.E and Skye Sweetnam.

Gemstone
In her teen years, Villalon joined the pop–rock band Gemstone, along with well-known actress Christina Vidal and musician Crystal Grant. Although no album was released for commercial sale, some of the tracks made during this period surfaced on compilations by Villalon in her later music project, Sweetbox.

Sweetbox

After Gemstone parted ways, Villalon, age 18 at the time, partnered as a singer and songwriter with producer and songwriter, Roberto "Geo" Rosan, for the pop project Sweetbox, and became the project's first multiple-award-winning vocalist. With Sweetbox, many of the project's songs brought attention for being based on famous classical pieces, and others achieved international chart success. She released five original albums under the project, Classified, Jade, Adagio, After the Lights and Addicted, as well as multiple compilations and a live DVD.

Throughout Villalon's time leading the project, she toured in many regions of Asia, with her music and voice being featured on a number of radio charts, television spots, product commercials, movie soundtracks, and video games. During this time, she was awarded as being Asia's #1 cross-over artist, with each her releases achieving Gold or Platinum status in Korea. After this success, issues started with the original owners of the Sweetbox franchise, and Villalon left the project behind to start her new pop project, under her own name, "Jade Valerie".

Jade Valerie
In 2007, Villalon, along with her long-time Sweetbox partner, "Geo", left the project name of Sweetbox behind to start work on Villalon's new music project, titled under her own name, 'Jade Valerie'. Later that year, Villalon released the album, Out of the Box, the title being a play on words of the departure from Sweetbox, to critical acclaim.  Her 9th album, Bittersweet Symphony, reached positions such as #15 on the Oricon charts.  She re-released Out of the Box in Korea, containing some of the tracks from her original album of the same name, as well as many tracks of Bittersweet Symphony. She also re-recorded the song "You Don't Know Me" with guest vocalist Kim Dong Wan, member of Korean group Shinhwa.

After her continued success, Villalon released information that two new albums were to be expected soon, and that The Cheetah Girls had performed a song, titled "Human" on their TCG album, that she had written for the Disney-produced vocalist team. Later this year, it was announced that Villalon and "Geo" had teamed up with Japanese violinist, Emiri Miyamoto, for a collaboration album entitled 'Saint Vox'. In 2010, it was announced that Villalon and Geo had released a single, once again under the 'Jade Valerie' moniker, and was titled "Don't Tell Me I'm Wrong", featuring the vocals of K-pop vocalist Brian Joo, member of the group Fly To The Sky. Over a year after this release, it was published that Villalon had performed in a duet with The Gypsies, a track that will be released the latter's upcoming album. In 2012, Villalon collaborated with actor Brandon Jones on a song entitled "In The Moment".

Eternity
In 2009, Villalon and "Geo" confirmed they had started a new project, entitled 'Eternity ∞'. Releasing the self-titled album Eternity ∞ on June 3, 2009, each track sampled a famous classical piece, many using pieces previously used in Sweetbox, such as Canon in D major by Pachelbel and Solveig's Song by Grieg. The album contained singles "I Will," "Love," and "Wonderful World," the latter being featured in a number of Korean television spots. The release was supported by a showcasing event sponsored by Elle Magazine.

In 2017, Villalon released a new song under the project name titled "Heartkick" for the compilation album, 'Happy Merry Wedding.'

Saint Vox
In 2010, Villalon stated that she was working on a project entitled Saint Vox, a collaboration between herself and the violinist Emiri Miyamoto. The self-titled album, Saint Vox, was released November 25, 2010. The album featured the sampling of six famous Japanese and Korean compositions, and six songs featuring original compositions by long-time producer, "Geo". The first single, entitled "Don't Leave Me This Way", debuted on Emiri Miyamoto's radio show on October 11, 2010.

Career break

After a four-year absence since the release of the Saint Vox album, a message from Villalon was posted on her fansite, "Jade Valerie Nation," in January 2015 saying,

"First and foremost I've been focusing on family. I've been spending much needed and missed time with my loved ones. I also got married to someone wonderful and I had a gorgeous baby girl. I feel really lucky and grateful for this chapter in my life and I'm taking the time to enjoy it and learn from it.

"Many artists take a few years to regroup between albums but I had never done that. I had been recording, writing, touring and promoting albums for 11 years straight!

"I have really missed making albums for myself but after all the drama that ensued after Geo and I parted ways with our business manager (HS) I felt like I owed it to the fans who love and buy my albums to take some space and make something great for them.

"I've had the privilege to spend the last years also doing a lot of writing for other recording artists and TV shows in Los Angeles and mainly in Nashville. It's been awesome to make music in other genre's that I love especially country.

"I know some strange demo's got leaked and some snippets from small shows so it was confusing to figure out what I have been up to. People have asked me why I haven't put things on youtube or posted them, and the reason is normally you keep that kind of stuff confidential for the artists or projects that you are working with. I've also been performing and trying new stuff out ( I dare you to find it on youtube! hint country ) and basically just being an artist.

"Geo and I have remained close friends, and obviously we have a long history. We have also been collaborating for some of his artists and others, as you are now hearing on Symphobia. We will still do music together in the future for me, for others, for anything because we both love making music.

"So yes I am still here, still singing, still writing, and still listening and reading what you have to say! Don't worry I am not done yet! Thanks for all the years of support you given me. I don't ever take it for granted, and there isn't a day that goes by that I don't think of the fans who brought me to where I am today."

Return to Sweetbox

In 2020, GEO and Jade both came back to Sweetbox, joined by new member, Saint Viv. Together they released both a new album, Da Capo, and a new compilation, Happy Wedding Complete Best on February 26, 2020.

Discography

Albums

-Sweetbox- (Sweetbox discography)
 Classified (2001)
 Jade (2002)
 Adagio (2004)
 After the Lights (2004)
 Addicted (2006)
 Da Capo (2020)

-Jade Valerie-
(Jade Valerie Discography)
 Out of the Box (2007)
 Bittersweet Symphony (2008)

-Eternity ∞-
(Eternity ∞ discography)
 Eternity ∞ (2009)

-Saint Vox-
(Saint Vox discography)
 Saint Vox (2010)

References

External links
 Official Jade Valerie Villalon website
 
 

1980 births
Living people
American expatriates in Switzerland
Sweetbox members
Video game musicians
Avex Group artists
Universal Music Japan artists
Musicians from San Diego
21st-century American singers
21st-century American women singers